Acacia alpina (alpine wattle) is an evergreen shrub that is endemic to south eastern Australia.

Description
The branchlets have caducous deltate stipules.

Distribution
The shrub has a disjunct distribution and is found in the Snowy Mountains of New South Wales and southern parts of the Australian Capital Territory with a range that continues further south to around Mount Baw Baw in the eastern Victorian highlands. It is often situated in granitic and windswept areas and sometimes forms dense thickets. It is often a part of woodland and heathlands communities.

It is a close relative of Acacia phlebophylla and they tend to hybridize.  It  often can be found in alpine and subalpine areas of Australia.
  A. alpina flowers from October to November.
In gardening it is used as "ground cover."

See also
List of Acacia species

References

External links 
Acacia alpina Herbarium Sheet (PlantNet)

alpina
Shrubs
Fabales of Australia
Flora of Victoria (Australia)
Taxa named by Ferdinand von Mueller